Zoltán Judik (born 5 May 1933) is a former Hungarian basketball player. He competed in the men's tournament at the 1960 Summer Olympics.

References

1933 births
Living people
Hungarian men's basketball players
Olympic basketball players of Hungary
Basketball players at the 1960 Summer Olympics
Basketball players from Budapest